Två mörka ögon is a 1991 album from Swedish "dansband" Sven-Ingvars.

Track listing
Två mörka ögon
Jag ringer på fredag
Virus och bakterier
Börja om från början
På sångens vingar
Markandsdagen
Min gamla vän
Nidälven
I en röd liten stuga
Det var i vår ungdoms fagraste vår
Regnets rytm (Rhythm of the Rain)
Marina
Barndomshemmet (On the Banks of the Wabash, Far Away)
Fryksdalsdans
DamhsaFreexDals

Charts

References

1991 albums
Sven-Ingvars albums